Mocha is a JavaScript test framework for Node.js programs, featuring browser support, asynchronous testing, test coverage reports, and use of any assertion library.

Assertion Libraries 
Mocha can be used with most JavaScript assertion libraries, including:

 should.js
 express.js
 chai
 better-assert
 unexpected

Usage and examples 
$ npm install -g mocha
$ mkdir test
$ $EDITOR test/test.js # or open with your favorite editor
var assert = require("assert")
describe('Foo', function(){
  describe('#getBar(value)', function(){
    it('should return 100 when value is negative') // placeholder
    it('should return 0 when value is positive', function(){
      assert.equal(0, Foo.getBar(10));
    })
  })
})
$  mocha
.
1 test complete (1ms)

For asynchronous testing, invoke the callback, and Mocha will wait for completion.

describe('Foo', function(){
  describe('#bar()', function(){
    it('should work without error', function(done){
      var foo = new Foo(128);
      foo.bar(done);
    })
  })
})

See also 

 Jasmine
 List of unit testing frameworks
 npm
 QUnit
 Unit.js
 Jest
JavaScript framework
JavaScript library

References

External links 
 

JavaScript libraries
JavaScript programming tools
Software using the MIT license
2011 software